Josué Gastón Gaxiola Leyva (born 2 September 1997) is a Mexican beach volleyball player. He competed in the 2020 Summer Olympics.

References

External links
 
 
 
 

1997 births
Living people
Mexican beach volleyball players
Olympic beach volleyball players of Mexico
Beach volleyball players at the 2020 Summer Olympics
Sportspeople from Sinaloa
People from Guasave